Duchess Anna Sophie of Saxe-Gotha-Altenburg (22 December 1670 – 28 December 1728) was a princess of Saxe-Gotha-Altenburg and Duchess in Saxony by birth, and by marriage a Princess of Schwarzburg-Rudolstadt.

Ancestry
She was the daughter of Frederick I, Duke of Saxe-Gotha-Altenburg (1646–1691) and Magdalena Sibylle, Duchess of Saxe-Weissenfels (1648–1680).

Her father was a fourth-generation descendant of John Frederick, Elector of Saxony in direct male line. He was also a fourth-generation descendant of his wife Sybille of Cleves who was daughter of John III, Duke of Cleves and older sister of both Anne of Cleves and Wilhelm, Duke of Jülich-Cleves-Berg.

The Elector was father to John William, Duke of Saxe-Weimar (1530–1573). He married Dorothea Susanne of Simmern, a daughter of Frederick III, Elector Palatine.

They were parents to John II, Duke of Saxe-Weimar (1570–1605). He married Dorothea Maria of Anhalt, a granddaughter of Christoph, Duke of Württemberg and great-granddaughter of Ulrich, Duke of Württemberg.

John and Dorothea Maria were parents to Ernst I, Duke of Saxe Coburg. He married his cousin Elisabeth Sophie of Saxe-Altenburg. As a result, their son Frederick I inherited both Duchies as the Duke of Saxe-Gotha-Altenburg in 1675.

Marriage
She married Louis Frederick I, Prince of Schwarzburg-Rudolstadt (15 October 1667- 24 June 1718).  They had the following children:
 Frederick Anton
 Amalie Magdalene
 Sophie Louise
 Sophie Juliane
 William Louis
 Christiane Dorothea
 Albert Anton
 Emilie Juliane
 Anna Sophie
 Dorothea Sophie
 Louise Friederike
 Magdalene Sibylle
 Louis Günther II

Via her eponymous daughter, Anna Sophie was an ancestor of both Queen Victoria and Prince Albert and their cousins Carlota of Mexico and Leopold II of Belgium

Ancestry

References

1670 births
1728 deaths
House of Saxe-Gotha-Altenburg
House of Schwarzburg
Princesses of Saxe-Gotha-Altenburg
Princesses of Schwarzburg
Daughters of monarchs